The Eskaleut, Eskimo–Aleut or Inuit–Yupik–Unangan languages are a language family native to the northern portions of the North American continent and a small part of northeastern Asia. Languages in the family are indigenous to parts of what are now the United States (Alaska); Canada (Inuit Nunangat) including Nunavut, Northwest Territories (principally in the Inuvialuit Settlement Region), northern Quebec (Nunavik), and northern Labrador (Nunatsiavut); Greenland; and the Russian Far East (Chukchi Peninsula). The language family is also known as Eskaleutian, Eskaleutic or Inuit–Yupik–Unangan.

The Eskaleut language family is divided into two branches: the Eskimoan languages and the Aleut language. The Aleut branch consists of a single language, Aleut, spoken in the Aleutian Islands and the Pribilof Islands. Aleut is divided into several dialects. The Eskimoan languages are divided into two branches: the Yupik languages, spoken in western and southwestern Alaska and in Chukotka, and the Inuit languages, spoken in northern Alaska, Canada and Greenland. Inuit languages, which cover a huge range of territory, are divided into several varieties. Neighbouring varieties are quite similar, although those at the farthest distances from the centre in the Diomede Islands and East Greenland are quite divergent.

The proper place of one language, Sirenik, within the Eskimoan family has not been settled. While some linguists list it as a branch of Yupik, others list it as a separate branch of the Eskimoan family, alongside the Yupik and Inuit languages.

History
The Alaska Native Language Center believes that the common ancestral language of the Eskimoan languages and of Aleut divided into the Eskimoan and Aleut branches at least 4,000 years ago. The Eskimoan language family split into the Yupik and Inuit branches around 1,000 years ago.

The Eskaleut languages are among the native languages of the Americas. This is a geographical category, not a genealogical one. The Eskaleut languages are not demonstrably related to the other language families of North America and are believed to represent a separate, and the last, prehistoric migration of people from Asia.

Alexander Vovin (2015) notes that northern Tungusic languages, which are spoken in eastern Siberia and northeastern China, have Eskaleut loanwords that are not found in Southern Tungusic, implying that Eskaleut was once much more widely spoken in eastern Siberia. Vovin (2015) estimates that the Eskaleut loanwords in Northern Tungusic had been borrowed no more than 2,000 years ago, which was when Tungusic was spreading northwards from its homeland in the middle reaches of the Amur River. Vovin (2015) considers the homeland (Urheimat) of Proto-Eskaleut to be in Siberia rather than in Alaska.

Internal classification 

Eskaleut
Aleut (Unangam Tunuu) (40–80 speakers)
Western–Central dialects: Atkan, Attuan † (1997), Bering † (2021), Unangan 
Eastern dialects: Unalaskan, Pribilof

Eskimoan
Sirenik (Uqeghllistun) † (1997) 
Yupik or Western Eskimoan
Alutiiq or Pacific Gulf Yupik (ca. 80 speakers)
Koniag Alutiiq (Alutiit’stun)
Chugach Alutiiq (Sugt’stun)
Central Alaskan Yup'ik (5,000 speakers ±50%)
General Central Alaskan Yup'ik (Yugtun)
Chevak Cupꞌik (Cugtun)
Nunivak Cupʼig (Cugtun) (5–25 speakers)
Naukan (Nuvuqaghmiistun) (70 speakers)
Central Siberian Yupik (Yuit/Yupigestun) ("Yuit" in Russia, "Yupigestun" in Alaska; Chaplino and St. Lawrence Island)
Chaplino (Chaplinski) Yupik (Ungazighmiistun) (ca. 200 speakers)
St. Lawrence Island Yupik (Sivuqaghmiistun) (400–750 speakers)
Inuit or Eastern Eskimoan (ca. 100,000 speakers)
Iñupiaq or Inupiat (northern Alaska, 5,000 speakers ±50%)
Qawiaraq or Seward Peninsula Inupiaq
Inupiatun/Iñupiatun or Northern Alaska Inupiaq (including Uummarmiutun (Aklavik, Inuvik))
Inuvialuktun (western Canada; 1,020 speakers, 2016 census)
Siglitun (Paulatuk, Sachs Harbour, Tuktoyaktuk)
Inuinnaqtun (in Ulukhaktok also known as Kangiryuarmiutun)
Natsilingmiutut (Netsilik area, Nunavut)
Inuktitut (eastern Canada; 36,000 speakers, 2016 census)
Inuttitut or Nunatsiavummiutut (Nunatsiavut, 550 speakers)
Nunavimmiutitut (Nunavik)
Qikiqtaaluk nigiani (South Baffin)
Qikiqtaaluk uannangani or Iglulingmiut (North Baffin)
Aivilingmiutut (east-central Nunavut)
Kivallirmiutut (Southeast Nunavut)
Inuktun or Avanersuaq (Polar Eskimo, Greenland, 800 speakers)
Greenlandic (Greenland: 50,000 speakers Greenland, 7,000 Denmark)
Kalaallisut (West Greenlandic, 44,000 speakers)
Tunumiisut (East Greenlandic, 3,000 speakers)

Position among the world's language families 

Eskaleut does not have any genetic relationship to any of the world's other language families, this being generally accepted by linguists at the present time. There is general agreement that it is not closely related to the other language families of North America. The more credible proposals on the external relations of Eskaleut all concern one or more of the language families of northern Eurasia, such as Chukotko-Kamchatkan just across the Bering Strait. One of the first such proposals, the Eskimo–Uralic hypothesis, was suggested by the pioneering Danish linguist Rasmus Rask in 1818, upon noticing similarities between Greenlandic and Finnish. Perhaps the most fully developed such proposal to date is Michael Fortescue's Uralo–Siberian hypothesis, published in 1998 which links Eskaleut languages to Yukaghir and the Uralic languages.

More recently Joseph Greenberg (2000–2002) suggested grouping Eskaleut with all of the language families of northern Eurasia (Indo-European, Uralic, Altaic, Korean, Japanese, Ainu, Nivkh/Gilayak, and Chukchi–Kamchatkan), with the exception of Yeniseian, in a proposed language family called Eurasiatic. Such proposals are not generally accepted. Criticisms have been made stating that Greenberg's hypothesis is ahistorical, meaning that it lacks and sacrifices known historical elements of language in favour of external similarities. Although the Eurasiatic hypothesis is generally disregarded by linguists, one critique by Stefan Georg and Alexander Vovin stated that they were not willing to disregard the theory immediately although ultimately agreed that Greenberg's conclusion was dubious. Greenberg explicitly states that his developments were based on the previous macro-comparative work done by Vladislav Illich-Svitych and Bomhard and Kerns. By providing evidence of lexical comparison, Greenberg hoped that it would strengthen his hypothesis.

Despite all these efforts, the Eurasiatic language theory was overruled on the basis that mass comparison is not accurate enough an approach. In comparative linguistics, the comparative method bases its validity on highly regular changes, not occasional semantic and phonological similarities, which is what the Eurasiatic hypothesis provides.

In the 1960s Morris Swadesh suggested a connection with the Wakashan languages. This was picked up and expanded by Jan Henrik Holst (2005).

Notable features 
Every word must have only one root (free morpheme) always at the beginning. Eskaleut languages have a relatively small number of roots: in the case of Central Alaskan Yup'ik, around two thousand. Following the root are a number of postbases, which are bound morphemes that add to the basic meaning of the root. If the meaning of the postbase is to be expressed alone, a special neutral root (in the case of Central Alaskan Yup'ik and Inuktitut pi) is used.

The basic word schema is as follows: root-(affixes)-inflection-(enclitic). Below is an example from Central Siberian Yupik.

There are a total of three affixes internal to the word 'angyagh.' The root (or free morpheme) 'angyagh' and the inflection '-tuq' on the right consist of the indicative mood marker plus third person singular. The enclitic –lu ‘also’ follows the inflection.

Following the postbases are non-lexical suffixes that indicate case on nouns and person and mood on verbs. The number of cases varies, with Aleut languages having a greatly reduced case system compared to Eskimoan. The Eskimoan languages are ergative–absolutive in nouns and in Yup'ik languages, also in verbal person marking. All Eskaleut languages have obligatory verbal agreement with agent and patient in transitive clauses, and there are special suffixes used for this purpose in subordinate clauses, which makes these languages, like most in the North Pacific, highly complement deranking.

At the end of a word there can be one of a small number of clitics with meanings such as "but" or indicating a polar question.

Phonologically, the Eskaleut languages resemble other language families of northern North America (Na-Dene and Tsimshianic) and far-eastern Siberia (Chukotko-Kamchatkan). There are usually only three vowels—, —though some Yup'ik dialects also have . All Eskaleut languages lack ejectives, in which they resemble the Siberian languages more than the North American ones.  Eskaleut languages possess voiceless plosives at four positions (bilabial, coronal, velar and uvular) in all languages except Aleut, which has lost the bilabial stops (though it has retained the nasal). There are usually contrasting voiced and voiceless fricatives at the same positions, and in the Eskimoan subfamily a voiceless alveolar lateral fricative is also present. A rare feature of many dialects of Yup'ik and Aleut is contrasting voiceless nasals.

Phonology

Eskimoan 

The following vowels and consonants were taken from Michael Fortescue et al., 2010

Vowels
Eskimoan  corresponds to Aleut .

Consonants 

Inuit allows only a single initial consonant and no more than two successive consonants between vowels.

Yupik lacks the consonant assimilation process so common to Inuit.

Consonants in parentheses are non-Proto-Eskimoan phonemes.

Aleut 

The following vowels and consonants were taken from Knut Bergsland, (1997).

Vowels

The Aleut language has six vowels in total: three short vowels /i/, /u/, /a/, and three long vowels /iː/, /uː/, /aː/. Orthographically, they would be spelled ii, uu, and aa. There are no diphthongs in Aleut vowels. The length of the vowel is dependent upon three characteristics: stress, surrounding consonants, and in particularly Eastern Aleut, surrounding vowels. Short vowels are in initial position if a following consonant is velar or labial. For example: the demonstratives uka, ika, and aka.

Long vowels are lower than their short counterpart vowels, but are less retracted if they make contact with a uvular consonant. For example: uuquchiing 'blue fox,' qiiqix̂ 'storm-petrel', and qaaqaan 'eat it!'

Consonants 

The Aleut consonants featured below include single Roman letters, digraphs, and one trigraph. Phonemes in parenthesis are found only in Russian and English loanwords, the phoneme in italics is found only in Eastern Aleut, and the bold phonemes are a part of the standard Aleut inventory.

Aleut lacks labial stops and allows clusters of up to three consonants as well as consonant clusters in word initial position.

Noteworthy phonological features: lack of a [p] and its voiceless nasals

Morphology

Language type

Polysynthetic language

Eskaleut is polysynthetic, which features a process in which a single word is able to contain multiple post-bases or morphemes. The Eskaleut languages are exclusively suffixing (with the exception of one prefix in Inuktitut that appears in demonstratives). Suffixes are able to combine and ultimately create an unlimited number of words. Some of the morphemes that are able to attach contain features such as carrying nominal subjects and objects, adverbial information, direct objects, and spatial noun phrases. Polysynthetic languages are said to be a form of extreme agglutination, which allows single words to carry the same information that another language expresses in whole clauses. For example, in Central Alaskan Yupik, one can say:

As a polysynthetic language, Eskaleut is concerned with what "each morpheme means, which categories it can attach to, whether there is any category change, etc. and what type of morphophonological effect occurs to the left as it attaches to the stem".

Morphosyntactic alignment

Ergative–absolutive language:
Eskaleut follows the basic word order of subject–object–verb (SOV).

Eskimoan is an ergative–absolutive language. This means subjects of intransitive verbs and objects of transitive verbs are marked with the absolutive case, while subjects of transitive verbs are marked with the ergative case.

Aleut is not an ergative–absolutive language. It does not matter if the verb is transitive or intransitive—subjects and objects are not marked differently.

If a transitive object or an object of possession is openly communicated, ergative case marking will not be expressed. If a transitive object or object of possession is not openly communicated, then ergative case marking will be expressed.

Example of case marking in Aleut:

Syntax 
The syntax of Eskaleut is concerned with the functional use of its morphological structure. The two language branches, although part of the same family, have separated and detached themselves in relation to grammatical similarities. Bergsland states that Aleut, which was once a language more similar to Proto-Eskimoan than the current Eskimoan languages themselves, has distanced itself from the ancient language.

The case inflections, "relative *-m, instrumental *-mEk/meN, and locative *-mi have undergone phonological merger and led to a completely different explanation of ergative morphology in Proto-Eskimoan.

In order to further explain the profound changes that have occurred in Aleutian syntax, Bergsland proposed the Domino Effect, which is ultimately the chronological order of Aleut’s unique features. Below is a step by step list of the 'domino effect':

The Domino Effect:
 The phonological reduction of final syllables and the ensuing syncretism of locative, relative, and instrumental case markers;
 The collapse of the ergative system and of the distinction between relative and locative case in postpositional constructions;
 The development of the unusual Aleut anaphoric reference system from the debris of this collapse, going hand in hand with a strict fixation of SOV word order;
 The simple 3rd person forms when the original morphemes began to refer to any anaphoric (non-overt) referent, and;
 The spread of such a referent's own number (including that of a possessor of some overt argument) to the final verb of the (complex) sentence, overriding agreement with the subject.

Vocabulary comparison 
The following is a comparison of cognates among the basic vocabulary across the Eskaleut language family (about 122 words). Note that empty cells do not imply that a particular language is lacking a word to describe the concept, but rather that the word for the concept in that language is formed from another stem and is not a cognate with the other words in the row. Also, there may be shifts in the meaning from one language to another, and so the "common meaning" given is only approximate. In some cases the form given is found only in some dialects of the language. Forms are given in native Latin orthographies unless otherwise noted.

Cognates of the Eskimoan languages can be found in Michael Fortescue et al., 2010.

Cognates of the Aleut language can be found in Knut Bergsland, 1997.

 Persons

 Pronouns

There are two types of pronouns: independent pronouns and pronominal pronouns.

 Pronouns in relation to nouns

In Eskaleut languages, singular, dual, and plural nouns are marked by inflectional suffixes, and if they are possessed, the number marker is followed by pronominal suffixes that specify the (human) possessor. There are no genders, and this can be seen in the four persons: my, your, his/her, his/her own.

"His/her own" specifies ownership, in contrast with "his/her", which does not. E.g., his house vs. his own house. (See Possessive determiner § Semantics.)

 Pronouns in relation to verbs

Aleut uses independent pronouns, instead of pronominal marking on verbs. On the other hand, Eskimoan languages have four persons and three numbers marked by pronominal suffixes.

 Independent pronouns

 Pronominal suffixes

 Interrogative words

 Body parts

 Animals

 Other nouns

 Adjectives

See also 

Proto-Eskimoan language
Proto-Eskaleut language
Eskimology
Uralo-Siberian
Eskimo-Uralic

Notes

Bibliography 
 Bergsland, Knut (1997). Aleut Grammar: Unangam Tunuganaan Achixaasix̂. United States of America: Alaska Native Language Center.
 Bernet, John W. 1974. An Anthology of Aleut, Eskimo, and Indian Literature of Alaska in English Translation. Fairbanks, Alaska.
 Booij, Geert; Lehmann, Christian; Mugdan, Joachim; Skopeteas, Stavros (2004). Morphologie / Morphology. Walter de Gruyter.
 Conference on Eskimo Linguistics, and Eric P. Hamp. 1976. Papers on Eskimo and Aleut Linguistics. Chicago: Chicago Linguistic Society.
 Crowley, Terry; Bowern, Claire (2010). An Introduction to Historical Linguistics. New York: Oxford University Press.
 Dumond, Don E. 1965. On Eskaleutian Linguistics, Archaeology, and Prehistory.
 Fleming, Harold C. 1987. "Towards a definitive classification of the world's languages." Diachronica 4.1/2:159-223.
 Fortescue, Michael D. 1984. Some Problems Concerning the Correlation and Reconstruction of Eskimo and Aleut Mood Markers. København: Institut for Eskimologi, Københavns Universitet. 
 Fortescue, Michael D., Steven A. Jacobson, and Lawrence D. Kaplan. 1994. Comparative Eskimo Dictionary with Aleut Cognates. Fairbanks, Alaska: Alaska Native Language Center, University of Alaska, Fairbanks. 
 Fortescue, Michael. 1998. Language Relations across Bering Strait: Reappraising the Archaeological and Linguistic Evidence. London and New York: Cassell. 
 Greenberg, Joseph H. 2000. Indo-European and Its Closest Relatives: The Eurasiatic Language Family, Volume 1: Grammar. Stanford, California: Stanford University Press.
 Greenberg, Joseph H. 2002. Indo-European and Its Closest Relatives: The Eurasiatic Language Family, Volume 2: Lexicon. Stanford, California: Stanford University Press.
 Gutman, Alejandro; Avanzati, Beatriz (2013). "Eskimo–Aleut Languages"
 Holst, Jan Henrik 2005. Einführung in die eskimo-aleutischen Sprachen. Hamburg: Buske.
 
 Marsh, Gordon H. 1956. The Linguistic Divisions of the Eskimo–Aleut Stock.
 Miyaoka, Osahito (2012). A grammar of Central Alaskan Yupik (cay). Mouton Grammar Library.
 Swift, Mary D. 2004. Time in Child Inuktitut: A Developmental Study of an Eskimo–Aleut Language. Studies on Language Acquisition 24. Berlin: Mouton de Gruyter.

External links 
 Alaska Native Language Center

 
Agglutinative languages
Language families
Aleut culture
Indigenous languages of Alaska
Languages of Russia